Chkalovsky District was an administrative and municipal district (raion) in Nizhny Novgorod Oblast, Russia. It was located in the west of the oblast. Its administrative center was the town of Chkalovsk. As of the 2010 Census, the total population of the district was 21,963, with the population of Chkalovsk accounting for 56.3% of that number.

History
The district was established in 1936 as Vasilyevsky District, but was renamed in 1937 in honor of Valery Chkalov. Per Law #67-Z of May 13, 2015, the district was transformed into a town of oblast significance of Chkalovsk. In a similar manner, Law #59-Z of May 8, 2015 abolished Chkalovsky Municipal District and transformed it into Chkalovsk Urban Okrug.

Administrative and municipal divisions
As of May 2015, the district was administratively divided into 1 town of district significance (Chkalovsk) and 8 selsoviets (comprising 228 rural localities). Municipally, Chkalovsky Municipal District was divided into one urban settlement and eight rural settlements.

References

Notes

Sources

Districts of Nizhny Novgorod Oblast
States and territories established in 1936
1936 establishments in the Soviet Union
States and territories disestablished in 2015